Krentjebrij is a Groningen/north Drenthe name for a traditional soup or porridge-like dessert with juice of berries that is eaten either warm or cold. It is also known as watergruel or krintsjebrij in Friesland. While there is no exact English translation for the word Krentjebrij, it could be called Raisin Porridge, Berry Soup, Berry Gruel, or a literal translation could be "currants cooked to mush". A commercially available product called Bessola is made in the Netherlands.

Common Ingredients:
water
hulled winter barley (Barley Groats or hulled and polished winter barley (pearl barley)
red currant, black currant or bilberry juice
currants, raisins, apple, cherries, berries, and other fruits
sugar, honey, and/or cherry jello powder
lemon, salt, vinegar, and possibly cinnamon

See also

 List of desserts
 List of porridges

Dutch cuisine
Dutch words and phrases
Cuisine of Groningen (province)
Culture of Drenthe
Desserts
Porridges
Soups
Fruit dishes